The 2021–22 Nebraska Cornhuskers women's basketball team represented the University of Nebraska during the 2021–22 NCAA Division I women's basketball season. The Cornhuskers, led by sixth year head coach Amy Williams, played their home games at Pinnacle Bank Arena and were members of the Big Ten Conference.

They finished the season 24–9, 11–7 in Big Ten play to finish in sixth place.  As the sixth seed in the Big Ten women's tournament they defeated Illinois in the Second Round and Michigan in the Quarterfinals before losing to eventual champions Iowa in the Semifinals.  They received an at-large bid to the NCAA tournament as the eighth seed in the Wichita Regional.  They lost to Gonzaga in the First Round to end their season.

Previous season
The Cornhuskers finished the season the season 13–13, 9–10 in Big Ten play to finish in ninth place.  As the eight seed in the Big Ten women's tournament they defeated Minnesota in the Second Round before losing to eventual champions Maryland in the Quarterfinals.  They received an at-large bid to the WNIT.  They played in the Memphis regional and defeated  in the First Round before losing to Colorado in the Second Round to end their season.

Roster

Schedule

Source:

|-
!colspan=6 style=| Exhibition

|-
!colspan=6 style=| Regular season

|-
!colspan=6 style=| Big Ten Women's Tournament

|-
!colspan=6 style=| NCAA tournament

Rankings

The Coaches Poll did not release a Week 2 poll and the AP Poll did not release a poll after the NCAA Tournament.

References

Nebraska Cornhuskers women's basketball seasons
Nebraska
2021 in sports in Nebraska
2022 in sports in Nebraska
Nebraska